The mata mata, mata-mata, or matamata (Chelus fimbriata) is a freshwater turtle species found in South America, primarily in the Amazon and Orinoco basins. It is one of two extant species in the genus Chelus, the other being Chelus orinocensis.

Taxonomy
The mata mata was described for the first time by French naturalist Pierre Barrère in 1741 as a "large land turtle with spiky and ridged scales" (translation).  It was first classified as Testudo fimbriata by German naturalist Johann Gottlob Schneider in 1783. It was renamed 14 different times in two centuries, finally being renamed Chelus fimbriata in 1992. Observations of morphological differences among specimens of mata mata found distinctive differences in the populations of the Amazon and Orinoco basins. A genomic analysis of the mata mata was reported in 2020, which showed a deep split between the populations in the Amazon and Orinoco basins. The authors proposed that the Orinoco population be assigned to a new species, Chelus orinocensis, with the Amazon population retaining the Chelus fimbriatus species designation.

Anatomy and morphology

The mata mata is a large, sedentary turtle with a large, triangular, flattened head with many tubercles and flaps of skin, and a "spike" on its long and tubular snout.  Three barbels occur on the chin and four additional filamentous barbels at the upper jaw, which is neither hooked nor notched.

The mata mata's plastron is reduced, narrowed, hingeless, shortened towards the front, and deeply notched at the rear with narrow bridges. These may be meant to allow the turtle to resemble a piece of bark, camouflaging it from possible predators. The plastron and bridges are cream to yellow or brown. The head, neck, tail, and limbs are grayish brown on adults. The neck is longer than the vertebra under its carapace and is fringed with small skin flaps along both sides. Hatchlings show a pink to reddish tinge in the underside edge of their carapaces and plastrons that gradually disappear as they grow.

Each forefoot has five webbed claws.  Males have concave plastrons and longer, thicker tails than females.

Habitat
The mata mata inhabits slow moving, blackwater streams, stagnant pools, marshes, and swamps ranging into northern Bolivia, eastern Peru, Ecuador, eastern Colombia, Venezuela, the Guianas, and northern and central Brazil.  The mata mata is strictly an aquatic species but it prefers standing in shallow water where its snout can reach the surface to breathe.

Behavior

The appearance of the mata mata's shell resembles a piece of bark, and its head resembles fallen leaves.  As it remains motionless in the water, its skin flaps enable it to blend into the surrounding vegetation until a fish comes close.  The mata mata thrusts out its head and opens its large mouth as wide as possible, creating a low-pressure vacuum that sucks the prey into its mouth, known as suction feeding.  The mata mata snaps its mouth shut, the water is slowly expelled, and the fish is swallowed whole; the mata mata cannot chew due to the way its mouth is constructed.

Reproduction
Males display for females by extending their limbs, lunging their heads toward the females with mouths agape, and moving the lateral flaps on their heads. Nesting occurs from October through December in the Upper Amazon. The 12 to 28 brittle, spherical, 35 mm-diameter eggs are deposited in a clutch.

Diet

The mata mata is carnivorous, feeding almost exclusively upon aquatic invertebrates (such as worms, mussels, crustaceans and insects) and fish. On rare occasions, it may feed on small birds, amphibians or small mammals that have entered the water. When the stomach content of 20 wild mata mata turtles was examined it consisted exclusively of small fish. The turtles predominantly feed at night in muddy water with limited visibility. However the turtle is well adapted to hunting in these conditions. The mata mata has very fine eyesight with eyes that reflect light, similar to other nocturnal reptiles. In addition, the skin flaps on the neck are also extremely sensitive and help the mata mata detect nearby movement.

Mata mata turtles use a specific method of seizing their prey. They will move the prey into shallower areas of water, surround the prey, and wave their front legs to prevent them from escaping. Once surrounded, the mata mata turtles will open their mouths and contract their pharynx, causing a rush of water that pushes the prey into their mouth.

In captivity

Mata mata turtles are readily available in the exotic pet trade and are quite expensive to obtain. Due to their unique appearance, they make interesting display animals. They also grow quite large. However, mata matas are not active hunters, so, like the alligator snapping turtle, they need less space than a large, active species.

As with all aquatic turtles, water quality is one of the keys to keeping this species successfully in captivity. Warm, acidic water is the best type used with a high tannin content that should be maintained all year round. Moderate to heavy filtration is recommended. Author David Fogel considers his captive mata mata turtles to be quite intelligent. For example, he has observed one turtle positioning itself near the spray bar of the aquarium at feeding time so that floating food is pushed beneath the water's surface where the turtle can catch it more easily.

References

Chelus
Turtles of South America
Fauna of the Amazon
Reptiles of Bolivia
Reptiles of Brazil
Reptiles of Colombia
Reptiles of Ecuador
Reptiles of French Guiana
Reptiles of Guyana
Reptiles of Peru
Reptiles of Suriname
Reptiles of Venezuela
Reptiles described in 1783
Extant Pliocene first appearances